

Y
 YAN  - Yancey Railroad
 YARR - Youngstown and Austintown Railroad
 YB - Youngstown Belt Railroad
 YCR - Yakima Central Railway
 YCRK - Yellow Creek Railroad
 YDHR - York Durham Heritage Railway
 YRC  - York Railway
 YKR  - Yorkrail; York Railway
 YRPL - Yelm Roy Prairie Line
 YS   - Youngstown and Southern Railway
 YSDX - Youngstown Steel Door Company
 YSMX - Canadian Gypsum Company
 YSRR - Youngstown and Southeastern Railroad
 YSTX - Youngstown Sheet and Tube Company
 YSVR - Yellowstone Valley Railroad
 YV   - Yosemite Valley Railway
 YVT  - Yakima Valley Transportation Company
 YW   - Yreka Western Railroad

Y